General Dunn may refer to:

Peter Dunn (general) (born 1947), Australian Army major general
Thomas W. Dunn (1908–1983), U.S. Army lieutenant general
Troy E. Dunn (fl. 1990s–2020s), U.S. Air Force major general
William McKee Dunn (1814–1887), U.S. Army brigadier general

See also
Francis Plunkett Dunne (died 1874), British Army major general
Martyn Dunne (born 1950), New Zealand Army major general